Mt Gravatt Bus Service is an Australian operator of bus services in South East Brisbane. It operates three services under contract to the Queensland Government under the Translink banner.

History
Originally named Burbank Busways the business was renamed Mt Gravatt Bus Service in 1995.

Current Routes 
The company currently operates 3 urban routes across Brisbane and Logan cities. They are:

Fleet
As at December 2022, the fleet consisted of 48 buses and coaches.

References

External links
Translink timetables

Bus companies of Queensland
Public transport in Brisbane
Translink (Queensland)